The Abdication is a 1974 British historical drama film directed by Anthony Harvey and starring Peter Finch and Liv Ullmann. The film's score was composed by Nino Rota. It tells a fictionalized version of the rumored love affair between Christina, Queen of Sweden and Cardinal Decio Azzolino during the former's stay in Rome after abdicating her throne.

Plot
After abdicating her throne and converting to Catholicism, Queen Christina arrives in Rome where Cardinal Azzolino is appointed to evaluate her and to help her to adapt to life in Rome. They fall in love but after the Pope's death, Azzolino rejects her to re-embrace his position in the church.

Cast
 Peter Finch as Azzolino
 Liv Ullmann as Queen Christina
 Cyril Cusack as Oxenstierna
 Paul Rogers as Altieri
 Graham Crowden as Barberini
 Michael Dunn as The Dwarf
 Kathleen Byron as Queen Mother
 Lewis Fiander as Dominic
 Harold Goldblatt as Pinamonti
 Tony Steedman as Carranza
 Noel Trevarthen as Ginetti
 Richard Cornish as Charles
 James Faulkner as Magnus 
 Ania Marson as Ebba 
 Franz Drago as Birgito
 Suzanne Huddart as Young Christina
 Debbie Nicholson as Young Ebba
 Edward Underdown as Christina's Father

See also
 List of British films of 1974

References

External links
 
 
 
 

1974 films
British biographical drama films
British historical drama films
Films directed by Anthony Harvey
Cultural depictions of Christina, Queen of Sweden
Biographical films about Swedish royalty
Films scored by Nino Rota
1970s biographical drama films
1970s historical drama films
Films set in the 17th century
Films set in Vatican City
Films shot at Pinewood Studios
Warner Bros. films
1974 drama films
1970s English-language films
1970s British films